Emil Selenka (27 February, 1842, Braunschweig – 20 February, 1902, Munich) was a German zoologist. He is known for his research on invertebrates and apes and the scientific expeditions he organized to Southeast Asia and South America.

Life 
Selenka was the son of bookbinder Johannes Selenka (1801–1871). He studied natural history at the University of Göttingen, and following a graduate dissertation on Holothuroidea, he remained in Göttingen as an assistant to Wilhelm Moritz Keferstein (1833-1870). His research was in this period mainly on the anatomy, taxonomy and embryology of marine invertebrates, especially organisms from the phylum Echinodermata. In 1868 he became a professor of zoology and comparative anatomy at the University of Leiden, followed by a professorship at the University of Erlangen in 1874. In 1895 he was given an honorary professorship at the University of Munich. He was co-founder of the journal Biologisches Zentralblatt.

His later research was on mammals. He studied the early development of the embryo and the development of the germ layer in mammals, and did comparative anatomic research on apes, especially gibbons and orangutans. He found evidence that the lateral distribution of orangutan races was caused by geographic isolation (a process called allopatric speciation). Selenka also examined the evolution of marsupials and their morphologic relation with reptiles. One problem he was interested in, was the evolutionary relation between Australian and South American marsupials.

In order to collect material, Selenka organized expeditions to tropical countries. In 1877 he undertook an expedition to Brasil. From 1892 he led an expedition that lasted two years to Southeast Asia, it visited Ceylon, the Dutch East Indies, Japan, China and Australia. Among the participants was his second wife, the zoologist and feminist Margarethe Selenka (1860-1922), whom he married in 1893. When Selenka became severely ill during his stay in the Dutch East Indies and had to return to Germany, his wife continued exploring the jungles of Borneo by herself. The couple wrote a report of their journeys together, titled "Sonnige Welten- Ostasiatische Reiseskizzen". Other publications by Emil Selenka are:
 Beiträge zur Anatomie und Systematik der Holothurien, (1867).
 Zoologische Studien, (1878).
 Studien über Entwickelungsgeschichte der Thiere, (12 volumes, 1883–1913, with Ambrosius Hubrecht).
 "Report on the Gephyrea, collected by H.M.S. Challenger during the years 1873-1876"; (published in English, 1885).
 Zoologisches Taschenbuch für Studierende zum Gebrauch bei Vorlesungen und praktischen Übungen zusammengestellt, (1897).

Between 1873 and 1874 and again from 1889 Selenka was a member of the Royal Netherlands Academy of Arts and Sciences.

Literature 

; 1922: Emil Selenka, ein Gedenkblatt zur achtzigsten Wiederkehr seines Geburtstages am 27. Februar, Naturwissenschaften 10(8), pp 179-181.

References

External links
 Zeno.org, translated biography
 Baltic and North East Atlantic Taxa, Biographical Etymology of Marine Organism Names

Scientists from Braunschweig
People from the Duchy of Brunswick
1842 births
1902 deaths
Academic staff of Leiden University
Members of the Royal Netherlands Academy of Arts and Sciences
Academic staff of the University of Erlangen-Nuremberg
19th-century German zoologists
Members of the Bavarian Academy of Sciences